Vengeance and Retribution Are Mine: Community, the Holocaust, and Abba Kovner's Avengers is a book by Israeli historian Dina Porat on Nakam, a small paramilitary organization of Holocaust survivors led by Abba Kovner and which plotted genocidal revenge against the German people. Porat chose the title to express her belief that the Jewish people should leave revenge to the God of Israel. It was first published in 2019 by Pardes Publishing / Haifa University Press in Hebrew, and is the first scholarly book on Nakam.

References

2019 non-fiction books
Ethnic cleansing of Germans
History books about genocide
History books about the Holocaust
Nakam
Israeli non-fiction books